A total of 173 players was planned to compete in badminton at the 2008 Summer Olympics in Beijing, People's Republic of China. Of them, 16 pairs competed in each doubles events, 41 players competed in the men's singles event and 47 players competed in the women's singles event.

Qualifying criteria

The main qualifying criterion was the BWF Ranking list as of May 1, 2008. It provided a total of 16 pairs in each doubles event and 38 athletes in each singles event, in the following manner:
Rankings 1–4: Players/pairs will be taken in turn unless a NOC has already qualified 3 players/pairs.
Rankings 5–16: Players/pairs will be taken in turn unless a NOC has already qualified 2 players/pairs.
Rankings 17+: Players/pairs will be taken in turn unless a NOC has already qualified 1 player/pair.

Each continent was guaranteed one entry in each event. If this was not satisfied by the entry selection method described above, the highest ranking player/pair had qualified. If there wa no player/pair in the rankings, the winner of the most recently contested Continental Championship was qualified.

The host nation (People's Republic of China) entered 2 players in total, but more than 2 players were permitted if they all qualified under qualifying regulations.

There were also 2 invitational places in each singles event which was be allocated by the IOC Tripartite Commission.

Summary

Qualifiers
The color pink signifies that a player withdrew from the competition.

Men's singles

Women's singles

Men's doubles

Women's doubles

Mixed doubles

References

External links
Olympics 2008 Player List

Qualification for the 2008 Summer Olympics
Qualification